Ambolomadinika is a rural municipality in Madagascar. It belongs to the district of Ikongo, which is a part of Fitovinany. The population numbered to 17,616 inhabitants in 2018.

Only primary schooling is available. The majority 98% of the population of the commune are farmers.  The most important crops are coffee and rice, while other important agricultural products are bananas and cassava. Services provide employment for 2% of the population.

References

Populated places in Fitovinany